The Dresden Museum of Ethnology contains an ethnographic collection with more than 90,000 artefacts from all parts of the earth. It is part of the Dresden State Art Collections.
Founded in 1875, the museum presents continually changing exhibitions in the Japanisches Palais, a Baroque building complex in Dresden, Germany.

The collection has its origins in the cabinet of curiosities established by Augustus, Elector of Saxony in 1560.

See also
 List of museums in Saxony

External links

 Ethnographical Museum Homepage of the Dresden State Art Collections
  Information and history from the Dresden & Saxony tourist site

Staatliche Kunstsammlungen Dresden
Ethnographic museums in Germany
Museums established in 1875
1875 establishments in Germany
Archives in Germany
Education in Dresden
Tourist attractions in Dresden